Bolesław Płotnicki (17 June 1913 – 7 September 1988) was a Polish actor. He appeared in more than 80 films and television shows between 1953 and 1983.

Selected filmography
 Shadow (1956)
 Kwiecień (1961)
 The Impossible Goodbye (1962)
 Nieznany (1964)
 Gniazdo (1974)

References

External links

1913 births
1988 deaths
Polish male film actors
Actors from Kyiv
Polish male stage actors
Polish male television actors
Lviv Polytechnic alumni
Polish military personnel of World War II
Polish prisoners of war in World War II
Recipients of the Order of Polonia Restituta